Elections to Metropolitan Borough of Bermondsey were held in 1959.

The borough had 13 wards which returned between 3 and 5 members. Of the 13 wards 9 of the wards had all candidates elected unopposed. Labour won all the seats, the Conservatives only stood in 4 wards and the Liberal Party 1 ward.

Election result

|}

References

Council elections in the London Borough of Southwark
1959 in London
1959 English local elections
Bermondsey